Veidas (literally: face) was a weekly news magazine published in  Lithuania from 1992 to 2017. It focused on the world news, politics and business.

History and profile
Veidas started publishing in 1992. The magazine was published by Veido periodikos leidykla weekly on Thursdays and has its headquarters in Vilnius. The first editor-in-chief of the magazine was Aurelijus Katkevičius. It ceased publication in July 2017. The weekly "Veidas" was published by "Veido periodikas leidykla", which also publishes the magazines "Moters savaitalis", "Auto Bild Lietuva" and "Mažylis".

The magazine published an annual list of the richest Lithuanians.

See also
 List of magazines in Lithuania

References

External links
Official website

1992 establishments in Lithuania
2017 disestablishments in Lithuania
Defunct magazines published in Lithuania
Free Media Awards winners
Lithuanian-language magazines
Magazines established in 1992
Magazines disestablished in 2017
Mass media in Vilnius
News magazines published in Europe
Weekly news magazines